This article is about '''public holidays in Antigua and Barbuda.

Holidays

Variable dates

2020
Easter – April 12
Labour Day – May 4
Whit Monday – June 1
August Monday – August 3
2021
Easter – April 4
Labour Day – May 3
Whit Monday – May 24 
August Monday – August 2
2022
Easter – April 17
Labour Day – May 2
Whit Monday – June 6 
August Monday – August 1
2023
Easter – April 9
Labour Day – May 1
Whit Monday – May 29 
August Monday – August 7
2024
Easter – March 31 
Labour Day – May 6
Whit Monday – May 20 
August Monday – August 5
2025
Easter – April 20
Labour Day – May 5
Whit Monday – June 9
August Monday – August 4
2026
Easter – April 5
Labour Day – May 
Whit Monday – 
August Monday – August 
2027
Easter – March 28 
Labour Day – May 4
Whit Monday – 
August Monday – August 3
2028
Easter – April 16
Labour Day – May 1
Whit Monday – 
August Monday – August 7
2029
Easter – April 1
Labour Day – May 1
Whit Monday – 
August Monday – August 7

See also
Bank holiday
List of holidays by country

References

Antigua and Barbuda
Antigua and Barbuda culture
Holidays
Antigua and Barbuda